Ogston can refer to the following people or places. Ogston is a Scottish surname originating from ancient Moray and Aberdeenshire. The late Diana, Princess of Wales is claimed to be descended from a branch of the Ogston family. She was the 4th Great-Granddaughter of Alexander Ogston (1766-1838).

People
Sir Alexander Ogston (1844–1929), British surgeon
Alexander George Ogston (1911–1996), British biochemist
Cyril Ogston (fl. 1862), Mormon who left the United States to continue practicing polygamy in Canada
John Ogston (1939–2017), Scottish professional footballer
Tammy Ogston (born 1970), Australian football (soccer) referee

Geographical locations
Ogston Reservoir, a reservoir in Derbyshire, England
Ogston Hall, 18th-century country house in Derbyshire, England